David Sean Fizdale (born June 16, 1974) is an American professional basketball manager. He is currently the assistant general manager for the Utah Jazz. He previously was an assistant coach for the Los Angeles Lakers, the head coach for the New York Knicks and Memphis Grizzlies, and was an assistant coach for the Atlanta Hawks, Golden State Warriors and the Miami Heat. He won two championships with the Heat in 2012 and 2013.

Career
Born in Los Angeles, Fizdale attended Fremont High School in Los Angeles, where he played as a point guard for the school's basketball team.  He subsequently attended college at the University of San Diego, where he graduated with a B.A. in communications and a minor in sociology.

Between 2003 and 2016, Fizdale was an assistant coach for the Golden State Warriors, Atlanta Hawks, and Miami Heat. During his tenure with the Heat, Fizdale coached "Team Shaq", a squad selected by Shaquille O'Neal, at the 2013 Rising Stars Challenge during the NBA All-Star Weekend. His team was defeated 163–135, by Charles Barkley's "Team Chuck", coached by then San Antonio Spurs' assistant coach Mike Budenholzer. After the reshuffle of the Heat's coaching staff, Fizdale became an associate head coach after Ron Rothstein decided to retire from his coaching career and Bob McAdoo was assigned to the scouting staff.

On May 29, 2016, Fizdale was named as the head coach of the Memphis Grizzlies. He led the Grizzlies to a 43–39 record in the 2016–17 season, reaching the Western Conference playoffs. After a 7–12 start to the 2017–18 season, including eight consecutive losses, and a publicized fourth-quarter benching of Marc Gasol, Fizdale was fired from the team on November 27, 2017.

On May 7, 2018, Fizdale was named as the head coach of the New York Knicks signing a four-year deal with the organization. On December 6, 2019, he was fired by the Knicks after a 4–18 start to their season.

In September 2021, Fizdale was hired as an assistant coach of the Los Angeles Lakers under Frank Vogel.

On June 28, 2022, Fizdale was hired as the associate general manager for the Utah Jazz.

Head coaching record

|-
| style="text-align:left;"|Memphis
| style="text-align:left;"|
| 82||43||39|||| style="text-align:center;"|3rd in Southwest||6||2||4|||| style="text-align:center;"|Lost in First Round
|-
| style="text-align:left;"|Memphis
| style="text-align:left;"|
| 19||7||12|||| style="text-align:center;"|(fired)||—||—||—||—|| style="text-align:center;"|—
|-
| style="text-align:left;"|New York
| style="text-align:left;"|
| 82||17||65|||| style="text-align:center;"|5th in Atlantic||—||—||—||—|| style="text-align:center;"|Missed playoffs
|-
| style="text-align:left;"|New York
| style="text-align:left;"|
| 22||4||18|||| style="text-align:center;"|(fired)||—||—||—||—|| style="text-align:center;"|—
|- class="sortbottom"
| style="text-align:center;" colspan="2"|Career
| 205||71||134|||| ||6||2||4||||

Personal life
Fizdale is married to marketer Natasha Sen and has one son from a prior relationship.
Natasha's birth father is Roy Singer and he lives in Australia. Natasha was born in Delhi India and her mother is Samira Sen and she lives in Canada.

References

External links

NBA.com: David Fizdale coach profile

Living people
1974 births
African-American basketball coaches
African-American basketball players
American men's basketball coaches
American men's basketball players
Atlanta Hawks assistant coaches
Basketball coaches from California
Basketball players from Los Angeles
Fresno State Bulldogs men's basketball coaches
Golden State Warriors assistant coaches
Memphis Grizzlies head coaches
Miami Heat assistant coaches
New York Knicks head coaches
San Diego Toreros men's basketball coaches
San Diego Toreros men's basketball players
Point guards
21st-century African-American sportspeople
20th-century African-American sportspeople